Paulo Marques may refer to:

 Paulo Marques (journalist) (1948–2006), Brazilian journalist, broadcaster and politician
 Paulo Lowndes Marques (1941–2011), Portuguese politician, lawyer, author, historian and conservationist
 Paulo Henrique Marques (born 1965), Brazilian footballer and manager